Yonathan Jesús Salinas Duque (born 31 May 1990 in Rubio, Venezuela) is a Venezuelan cyclist, who most recently rode for Venezuelan amateur team Atletico Venezuela.

Major results

2012
 1st  Young rider classification Vuelta al Táchira
2013
 Vuelta a Bolivia
1st Stages 1 & 9b (ITT)
 3rd Road race, National Road Championships
2014
 1st  Overall Vuelta a Venezuela
 8th Overall Vuelta al Táchira
1st Stage 2
2015
 Vuelta Ciclista a Costa Rica
1st  Points classification
1st Stage 3 
 2nd Overall Tour de Martinique
 3rd Overall Vuelta a Venezuela
2016
 1st Stage 3 Vuelta al Táchira
2017
 1st  Overall Vuelta al Táchira
1st  Mountains classification
1st Stages 5 & 8
 3rd Time trial, National Road Championships
2018
 3rd Overall Tour de Guadeloupe
1st  Points classification
1st Stages 4 & 6
2019
 Tour de Guadeloupe
1st  Mountains classification
1st Stage 2 
 3rd Overall Vuelta al Táchira
1st Stage 2
 3rd Overall Vuelta a Venezuela
2020
 4th Overall Vuelta al Táchira
2021 
 8th Overall Vuelta al Táchira

References

External links

1990 births
Living people
Venezuelan male cyclists
People from Rubio, Venezuela
20th-century Venezuelan people
21st-century Venezuelan people